O Song-chol is a North Korean Olympic boxer. He represented his country in the light-flyweight division at the 1992 Summer Olympics. He won his first bout against Anicet Rasoanaivo, and then lost his second bout to Daniel Petrov.

References

1970 births
Living people
North Korean male boxers
Olympic boxers of North Korea
Boxers at the 1992 Summer Olympics
Light-flyweight boxers